Denis Paradis  (born 1 April 1949) is a Canadian politician and lawyer who served as the Member of Parliament (MP) for Brome—Missisquoi from 2015 until 2019 and previously  from 1995 to 2006. A member of the Liberal Party of Canada, Paradis was Minister of State for Financial Institutions from 2003 to 2004.

His brother, Pierre Paradis, is a member of the National Assembly of Quebec and a provincial cabinet minister. The Paradis brothers are political allies.

Early life and private career

Paradis was born in Saint-Jean-sur-Richelieu, Quebec. He has a Bachelor of Commerce degree (1970) and a Bachelor of Civil Law degree (1975) from the University of Ottawa and was admitted to the Quebec Bar in 1976. In 1985, he co-authored the book Régles de procédure devant les tribunaux administratifs.

After working as a partner in the firm Paradis-Poulin, he became the president of the Quebec Bar Association in 1993. In June of the same year, he criticized the overcrowded state of some provincial courthouses. He owns a winery in Saint-Armand, Quebec.

First political offices (1995–2002)

Paradis was first elected to the House of Commons of Canada in a 1995 by-election, called after Gaston Péloquin, the sitting Bloc Québécois member for Brome—Missisquoi, was killed in an automobile accident. Paradis championed the Canadian federalist cause in the campaign and said that his election would confirm Brome-Missisquoi's place within a united Canada. The election was initially considered too close to call, but Paradis won by a significant margin. His victory was seen as helping the federalist cause in the buildup to the 1995 Quebec referendum on sovereignty.

Paradis entered parliament as a backbench supporter of Jean Chrétien's government. In late 1995, he helped launch a Summer Work/Student Exchange project that encouraged students to develop their second-language skills. He was elected chair of the Liberal Party's Quebec caucus in February 1997.

Paradis was returned to a second parliamentary mandate in the 1997 federal election, and in late 1997 he co-chaired a special committee that recommended Quebec's schools be divided on linguistic rather than denominational lines. He was named as parliamentary secretary to the minister for International Cooperation in January 1999, and in September of the same year he was promoted to parliamentary secretary to the minister of Foreign Affairs. He was again returned to parliament in the 2000 federal election.

Minister (2002–2004)

Chrétien government

Paradis was appointed as Secretary of State for La Francophonie and Secretary of State for Latin America and Africa in Chrétien's government on 15 January 2002. These were ministerial positions but not full cabinet portfolios.

Africa
Shortly after his appointment, Paradis met with Nigerian Information Minister Jerry Gana in an effort to prevent the execution of Safiya Hussaini. He later supported the Commonwealth's decision to suspend Zimbabwe for one year in the aftermath of that country's disputed 2002 presidential election.

Paradis accompanied Chrétien on a 2002 delegation to Africa that included stops in Morocco, Algeria, Nigeria, Senegal, Ethiopia and South Africa. He supported the New Partnership for Africa's Development (NEPAD), and in October 2002 he pledged more than two million dollars to promote security and good governance in francophone Africa.

In March 2003, Paradis announced that Canada would provide one hundred million dollars to Ethiopia, Senegal, Ghana, Mali, Mozambique, and Tanzania under the Canada Fund for Africa. The stated intent of this funding was to recognize improved commitments to human rights and democracy. Later in the same year, Paradis represented Canada at Olusegun Obasanjo's inauguration for a second term as President of Nigeria.

Paradis nominated former United Nations Secretary-General Boutros Boutros-Ghali to be named to the Order of Canada in 2002. Boutros-Ghali received the honour in 2004.

Latin America
Paradis led a Canadian trade delegation to Cuba in November 2002. This visit marked an improvement in relations between the countries, which had been strained for three years due to Canadian concerns about Cuba's human rights practices.

In January 2003, Paradis hosted a diplomatic event called the Ottawa Initiative on Haiti. At this meeting, representatives from Canada, France, the United States of America, and the Organization of American States discussed Haiti's political future. No representatives of the Haitian government were present. A few months later, journalist Michel Vastel leaked information about the meeting that he said was given to him by Paradis. Writing in L'Actualité, Vastel claimed that the delegates decided that Haitian President Jean-Bertrand Aristide should be replaced by a United Nations trusteeship within a year. Paradis has denied Vastel's claim.

The Francophonie
In December 2002, Paradis called for the creation of a watchdog organization to target human rights violations in Francophonie nations.

Martin government
Paradis was not, during Jean Chrétien's tenure as Prime Minister, among the group of Liberal parliamentarians (MPs) who supported Paul Martin's leadership ambitions. He nevertheless supported Martin at the 2003 Liberal Party leadership convention, which was held to elect Chrétien's successor. Martin won a landslide victory and became prime minister on 12 December 2003. When he formed his first ministry, he appointed Paradis as minister of state for Financial Institutions.

Paradis led several roundtable discussions with business, academic, and social groups in months that followed, during the buildup to the Martin government's 2004 budget. Shortly before budget day, he said that the government would return to a practice of setting aside four billion dollars per year to cover emergency spending or the possibility of an economic downturn.

Return to the backbenches and time out of office (2004–2015)
Paradis was narrowly re-elected in the 2004 federal election over Bloc challenger Christian Ouellet. He was not re-appointed to the ministry and returned to the government backbenches. He lost his seat to Ouellet in the 2006 election, amid losses for the Liberal Party across Quebec.

Paradis supported Stéphane Dion in the Liberal Party's 2006 leadership election. Dion won an upset victory in this contest, defeating Michael Ignatieff on the fourth ballot. Paradis attempted to reclaim his seat in the 2008 federal election but was narrowly defeated by Ouellet in a rematch from 2006.

Paradis ran for re-election in the 2011 federal election but lost to Pierre Jacob of the New Democratic Party amid a strong provincial swing to the NDP.

Return to Parliament (2015–2019)
Paradis again ran as the Liberal Party's candidate in Brome—Missisquoi during the 2015 federal election, and this time was victorious, beating New Democrat Catherine Lusson. He ran for the office of Speaker of the House of Commons of Canada, losing to fellow Liberal MP Geoff Regan.  Subsequently, he was elected to chair the Standing Committee on Official Languages. He did not run for re-election in the 2019 Canadian federal election.

Electoral record

References

1949 births
French Quebecers
Lawyers in Quebec
Liberal Party of Canada MPs
Living people
Members of the 26th Canadian Ministry
Members of the 27th Canadian Ministry
Members of the House of Commons of Canada from Quebec
Members of the King's Privy Council for Canada
People from Saint-Jean-sur-Richelieu
University of Ottawa alumni